Abel Tilahun (born 1983) is an Ethiopian-born artist who works across traditional and emerging art forms.  At the heart of his work is a concern for both the cutting edge and the long arc of history.

Early life and education  
Tilahun was born in Addis Ababa, Ethiopia in 1983 and grew up in an artistic environment.  His mother is a professionally trained clarinetist and his father is an engineer who enjoys painting.  He earned his BFA in Sculpture from Addis Ababa University, Alle School of Fine Arts and Design in 2006.  After moving to the United States, he earned his master's degree in Fine Art from Adams State University in 2010 and was recognized as the Cloyde Snook Scholar of 2009–10.

Artistic career 
Since his first solo show in 2007, "The Blueprint," Tilahun has exhibited his work on three continents.  He has held 2 subsequent solo shows, the most recent of which, "Interface Effect," was held from May–June 2014 in the Alliance Ethio-Francaise in Addis Ababa.  This show, as well as a number of group exhibitions in which Tilahun has participated, was curated by renowned independent curator Meskerem Assegued.  Tilahun's work is also featured within the three-artist video art exhibition "Curvature of Events," which was curated by Assegued in Dresden's celebrated New Master's Gallery at the Staatliche Kunstsammlungen Dresden (English: Dresden state art Collections).  This show opened on 16 October 2014 and will be on display until 4 January 2015.

Exhibitions 
Bolded entries indicate solo exhibitions. Other entries are group exhibitions.

 2014: "Interface Effect", curated by Meskerem Assegued. Alliance Ethio-Francaise, Addis Ababa, Ethiopia.
 2014: "Curvature of Events", curated by Meskerem Assegued. Staatliche Kunstsammlungen Dresden, Dresden, Germany.
 2013: "Heart-to-Heart: Rome to AddIs", curated by Meskerem Assegued. National Theatre Gallery, Addis Ababa, Ethiopia.
 2010: "A Generation Projected". Cloyde Snook Gallery, Alamosa, Colorado.
 2009: "Three on Paper". Lloyds Gallery, Fort Collins, Colorado.
 2009: "Works from the Valley's Edge". Edge Gallery, Denver, Colorado.
 2009: "Invitational Screening of The Hair". Indie Spirit Film Festival, Colorado Springs, Colorado.
 2008: "Ventero Open Press Exhibition". Cloyde Snook Gallery, Alamosa, Colorado.
 2008: "Milkshake". Hatfield Gallery, Alamosa, Colorado.
 2008: "Screening of The Hair". Alamosa Film Festival, Alamosa, Colorado.
 2007: "The Blueprint". Alliance Ethio-Francaise, Addis Ababa, Ethiopia.
 2006: "Undergraduate Thesis Show". Alle School of Fine Arts and Design, Addis Ababa, Ethiopia.
 2005: "Addis Abeba Zare", curated by Meskerem Assegued. Addis Ababa, Ethiopia.

Personal life 
Along with his studio practice in Washington, D.C. and Addis Ababa, Tilahun also teaches at American University in Washington D.C. as an adjunct professor of digital imaging, motion graphics, and animation. Tilahun married scholar-filmmaker Dr. Isabelle Zaugg in 2007.

References 

Ethiopian artists
1983 births
Living people
Addis Ababa University alumni
Adams State University alumni